Joel McDonald is an American voice actor, voice director, and scriptwriter who worked on English versions of anime series at Funimation.

Biography 
Since McDonald was 7, he had a love for acting. He soon started acting in plays at school and church, participating in community theater, secondary school theater and in speech competitions. Later, he acquired a BFA in Acting and Directing from Sam Houston State College. From that point onwards, McDonald took up acting professionally, taking parts in a national kids' theater tour, landing different roles in a couple dozen stage shows.

In 2006, after years of stage work in the Dallas-Fort Worth area, McDonald became involved in voice acting and also got into ADR directing and adaptive scriptwriting.

Career 
McDonald has provided voices for a number of English language versions of Japanese anime films and television shows, and video games. He is best known as the voice of Takumi Fujiwara from the Initial D series, Meow from Space Dandy, and Minato Sahashi from the Sekirei series, as well as the ADR director for the Funimation One Piece dub, in addition to Sgt Frog, Deadman Wonderland, Space Dandy and Initial D.

In the 2010s, McDonald has been cast in more lead/major roles, such as Akane from Divine Gate, Mikage from the Kamisama Kiss series, Bartholomew Kuma from One Piece, Zeref from Fairy Tail, Brief from Panty and Stocking, Hien from Chaos Dragon, Koki Mimura from Assassination Classroom, Azusa Hanai from Big Windup, Toshimitsu Kubo from the Baka and Test series, Hayato Ike from the second season of Shakugan no Shana onwards, Jacuzzi Splot from Baccano, Motoharu Kaido from Aesthetica of a Rogue Hero, Ikta Solok from Alderamin on the Sky, and Dilandau Albatou from the Funimation redub of The Vision of Escaflowne.

On February 15, 2018, he has resigned from Funimation as a director.

Personal life 
On March 18, 2016, Joel announced the birth of his son, Beck Austin McDonald. He is married to fellow voice actress Marie Charlson in 2014. His second son, Finn McDonald, was born on June 15, 2018.

Filmography

Anime

Film

Video games

References

External links 
 
 
 
 

Living people
American male screenwriters
American male stage actors
American male television actors
American male television writers
American male video game actors
American male voice actors
American television writers
American voice directors
Male actors from Dallas
Sam Houston State University alumni
Screenwriters from Texas
Writers from Dallas
Year of birth missing (living people)
21st-century American male actors
21st-century American male writers
21st-century American screenwriters